Urpad Beel is a natural lake located at Agia village in Goalpara district of Assam. This lake is situated 9 km away from Goalpara, the district headquarters of Goalpara district. Urpad Beel is one of the biggest natural lakes of Lower Assam.

Aquafauna
Urpad Beel is a natural habitat to many varieties of fishes and birds. The lake is an important habitat for Greater adjutant, Cotton Pigmy Goose, Baya Weavers, Lesser whistling duck and Kingfisher. This lake is also known for aquatic plants such as water lily and common water hyacinth.

Preservation
On 24 February 2020, Assam Soil Conservation and Social Welfare Minister Pramila Rani Brahma laid the foundation stone of a project worth INR 1 crore to beautify the Urpad Beel.

See also
List of lakes of Assam

References

Lakes of Assam
Goalpara district